Donald's Snow Fight is an animated short film featuring classic cartoon character Donald Duck in a snowball fight with his nephews Huey, Dewey and Louie. It was released in 1942 by Walt Disney Productions.

Plot
Donald goes out to play with a sled while singing "Jingle Bells". When Donald reaches the top of the hill, he notices his nephews, Huey, Dewey and Louie, at the bottom, building a snowman. Donald crashes his sled into their snowman, which prompts his nephews to plot revenge. The nephews craft a silly-looking snowman around a boulder and label it "Uncle Donald." Donald attempts to crash the snowman, only to crash into the boulder underneath it, destroying his sled and overcoat. An all-out snow war ensues, Donald Duck throws the snowballs which turns his nephews into bowling pins and literally bowls them over, he then freezes his ice missile which he launches splitting the flag pole in three parts spanking his nephews. His three nephews retaliate which they launch snow bombs with mouse traps which hits Donalds head and rear end getting a mouse trap in his tail feathers, he pops out with mouse traps on his bill and hands and throws a temper tantrum, his nephews launch snowballs which hits Donald's head, and ending with the nephews using flaming arrows to melt Donald's snow battleship and send him falling into the frozen lake below which Donald's body is frozen in place above the splash. To celebrate their victory, the triplets perform a stereotypical Native American dance. (This last shot was often cut when it aired on television.)

Voice cast
 Clarence Nash: Donald Duck, Huey, Dewey and Louie

Home media
The short was released on December 6, 2005 on Walt Disney Treasures: The Chronological Donald, Volume Two: 1942-1946.

References

External links
 
 

1942 films
1942 animated films
1940s Disney animated short films
Donald Duck short films
Films directed by Jack King
Films produced by Walt Disney
Films scored by Oliver Wallace
Films with screenplays by Carl Barks